Fallout is an upcoming post-apocalyptic television series developed by Lisa Joy and Jonathan Nolan for the streaming service Amazon Prime Video. It is based on the role-playing video game franchise created by Interplay Entertainment and now owned by Bethesda Softworks.

Amazon purchased the rights to produce a live-action project in 2020, and the show was announced that July alongside the reveal of Kilter Films' involvement. Shortly afterward, Lisa Joy and Jonathan Nolan became its head writers, and Bethesda Game Studios producer Todd Howard, who directed various games in the series, signed on to executive produce alongside Joy and Nolan. The duo of Geneva Robertson-Dworet and Graham Wagner were hired as the series' showrunners in January 2022, and Walton Goggins and Ella Purnell were cast in February and March, respectively.

Premise
The show depicts the aftermath of a nuclear war in an alternate history of a 1950s-esque retrofuturistic world.

Cast
 Walton Goggins
 Ella Purnell
 Kyle MacLachlan
 Xelia Mendes-Jones
 Aaron Moten
 Mike Doyle
 Moisés Arias

Production
It was announced in July 2020 that a television adaptation of the video game franchise had received a series commitment from Amazon Studios developed by Jonathan Nolan and Lisa Joy. Joy described the series as "a gonzo, crazy, funny, adventure, and mindfuck like none you’ve ever seen before".

Nolan will direct the pilot episode. Geneva Robertson-Dworet and Graham Wagner were hired as showrunners for the series. In February, Walton Goggins was cast in a lead role as a currently-unnamed Ghoul. In March, Ella Purnell joined the cast. In June, Kyle MacLachlan, Xelia Mendes-Jones and Aaron Moten joined as regulars. Filming began on July 5, 2022, in New Jersey, New York and Utah. It will release sometime in 2023 or 2024.

References

External links

Amazon Prime Video original programming
American television shows based on video games
Works by Lisa Joy
Works by Jonathan Nolan
Alternate history television series
English-language television shows
Live action television shows based on video games
Post-apocalyptic television series
Upcoming drama television series
Fallout (series)
Television series by Amazon Studios